AIDAnova is a cruise ship built by Meyer Werft GmbH in Papenburg, Germany under contract from Carnival Corporation for AIDA Cruises. The first of the new  ships, she was launched on 21 August 2018 and delivered on 12 December 2018.

She has one sister ship the AIDAcosma, delivered on December 21st 2021.

General information 
The ship is the first cruise ship in the world that can operate completely using liquefied natural gas (LNG), like the cruiseferry .

AIDAnova has four dual-fuel hybrid engines, which can use either LNG or traditional fuel oil.

Her delivery was marred by delays; complications arose from her engineering being the first-of-its-kind for a ship of her scale. In October 2018, the first postponement was announced, cancelling all scheduled preview cruises. A small fire had also broken out during its construction in the shipyard, delaying her sea trials. Her maiden voyage was then scheduled for 2 December 2018 from Hamburg. Later, in November 2018, a second postponement was announced. Her sea trials were scheduled to begin on 16 November 2018 and all work was scheduled to be completed by 30 November 2018. AIDAnova was delivered on 12 December 2018 and her maiden voyage was on 19 December 2018 for a seven-day cruise from Santa Cruz de Tenerife around the Canary Islands and Madeira. 

As of September 2019, AIDAnova was sailing on cruises around the Mediterranean and Canary Islands. In 2022 it has been sailing in Northern Europe, the port of Nordfjordeid in Norway is visited on every cruise.

References

External links

 AIDA Cruises official site page about the ship 

2018 ships
Cruise ships
Ships built in Papenburg
nova